(), also known as phoenix coronet or phoenix hat, is a type of  (a type of Chinese traditional headgear) for women in . It was worn mainly by noblewomen for ceremonies or official occasions.

Terminology 
 literally means "phoenix crown" in English language, a name that originates from its adornments: phoenixes made of inlaid kingfisher feathers, as well as gold dragons, beaded pheasants, pearls, and other gemstones. One of the earliest phoenix crowns that has been excavated belonged to Empress Xiao of the Sui dynasty. The type became most popular during the Ming dynasty, with many changes made over time.

History

It was in Eastern Jin (317–420 AD) that the word  first came up; however, it was referring to the hairpin which was imitating the comb of Chinese phoenix.

The earliest  discovered was the crown of Empress Xiao of the Sui dynasty, unearthed from the Emperor Yang of Sui's tomb in 2013. The crown was made under the order of Emperor Taizong of Tang after the empress's death. The artifact was protect-repaired and studied in Shaanxi Provincial Cultural Heritage Administration; later, a replica was made based on the studies.

Construction and design
Kingfisher feathers were extremely rare during the Ming Dynasty and were potentially sourced from Cambodia. The numbers of phoenixes, dragons and precious gems on each crown is different. For example, the phoenix crown of Ming Empress Xiaoduanxian has 6 dragons, 3 phoenixes, 5,449 pearls, 71 rubies, and 57 sapphires. Other phoenix crowns of empresses excavated from the Ming tombs have 9 phoenixes, between 12 and 9 dragons, more than 3,500 pearls, and more than 150 gemstones. The pearls, gemstones and kingfisher feathers were made into ornamental flowers, leaves, clouds, and temple ornaments (the 'wings' at the sides and back of the crown).

Styles
The number of dragons, phoenixes and pheasants, in addition to the presence of certain ornaments was dictated by rank.

Empresses

 is the 12-dragons-9-phoenixes crown. 

 is the 9-dragons-9-phoenixes crown.

 is the 9-dragons-4-phoenixes crown.

 is the 6-dragons-3-phoenixes crown.

 is the  3-dragons-2-phoenixes crown. 

Only the crowns of empresses and crown princesses (wife of crown prince) can have temple ornaments adorned, with the empress's crown having 6 blades of temple ornaments (3 on each side).

Imperial concubines and princesses
The crown princess can only have 4 blades of temple ornaments (2 on each side)

Noblewomen
All other noblewomen/wives and daughters of officials wear the pearl-and-emerald crown, where the crown is just adorned with pearls and gemstones (in various ornamental shapes). Phoenix crowns worn with  have no strings of pearls by the sides of the head. Noblewomen cannot have temple ornaments on their headdresses.

Wedding 
Coloured hats worn by commoner women on their wedding ceremony during the Ming and Qing dynasty was also called . The practice is believed to have started during Southern Song when the Emperor rewarded a girl for saving his life. The  was a symbol of good fortune. However, women who were remarrying for a second times and who were to be become a man's concubine were not allowed to wear .

Gallery

Related content 

Chinese hairpin

See also 
Consort crown
Hanfu
Qungua
Kokoshnik

References

Notes

Cited works

Chinese traditional clothing
Crowns (headgear)
Chinese headgear